Agayev (f. Agayeva) is a surname. Notable people with the surname include:

 Alan Agayev (born 1977), Ossetian-Russian footballer
 Bekkhan Agayev (born 1975), Russian politician
 Ednan Agayev (born 1956), Russian diplomat
 Emin Agaev (born 1973), Azerbaijani footballer
 Kamran Agayev (born 1986), Azerbaijani footballer
 Mirshahin Agayev (born 1963)
 Muslim Agaýew, Turkmenistani footballer
 Salahat Ağayev (born 1991), Azerbaijani footballer

See also 
 Aghayev